Edwin Macharia is a Kenyan businessman and corporate executive. He is the global managing partner, at Dalberg Advisors, the leading impact-first advisory firm with offices in North America, Europe, Africa, Asia and the Middle East. He was elected to that role in November 2019.

Background and education
Macharia was born on 1 January 1979 in Nairobi, Kenya's capital city to a father who was employed by Barclays Bank of Kenya, and a mother who was a high school teacher. The family relocated many times on account of the father's job; moving every three years or so. As a result, he attending a number of primary schools, including Mugumo-ini Primary School in Thika, Homabay Primary School in Homabay, Highland Primary School in Kericho and finally Mount Kenya Academy in Nyeri. While at Homabay, the roof of their classroom was blown away by a thunderstorm, so the class met under a tree for a year. Also at Homabay it was typical for the teachers to teach in Dholuo, the local language. This forced the young learner to pick up the language and become fluent fast.

After being ranked in the top 10 students nationally in the high school entrance examination (KCPE), he was admitted to Alliance High School, the oldest and most prestigious public high school in Kenya. While there, he was an active member of the Dramatics Society, leading the school's English play to the National Festivals competition. In the final high school graduation examination (KCSE) he was one of the top 100 ranked students in the country. He was admitted to join the University of Nairobi, Faculty of Medicine to begin his studies and become a doctor. However, he chose to spread his wings and joined Amherst College in Massachusetts, US, instead. There, he distinguished himself, serving in numerous leadership roles. He graduated with honors in Biology, writing his thesis on the evolution of infectious diseases.

Career
After university, Macharia was hired by McKinsey & Company, where he served clients in the pharmaceutical sector and financial services. 

When he left there, he joined the Clinton Foundation, where he held several roles, including as Director of the Rural Initiative for the HIV/AIDS Initiative of the foundation. In this capacity, he was responsible for developing and supporting the execution of programs that extend HIV/AIDS care and treatment services to low-level health facilities, in participating countries. His other role there was as Director of Agriculture, where he led a $100m foundation initiative focused on grassroot development.

In 2007, he ran for Member of Parliament in Kieni constituency against Chris Murungaru who had been implicated in the Anglo-leasing scandal. He came in second to Nemesyus Warugongo

In 2008, he joined Dalberg Advisors and established it's Nairobi office. He then became the Africa Regional Director where he was instrumental in building out the firm's footprint, talent and capabilities in Africa. He also played catalytic roles across the firm, including pioneering the Agriculture & Food Security practice; chairing the Strategy, Impact & Quality Committee, one of two governing bodies in the firm; and incubating Dalberg Implement, which allows Dalberg to take strategy recommendations and work alongside its clients to bring them to life..

At the end of 2019, Macharia was elected as Global Managing Partner at Dalberg Advisors, leading the firm across world He also continues to support clients on a range of issues including strategy, operational efficiency, and program implementation.

Other considerations
Macharia was named on Forbes’ 10 Most Powerful Men in Africa in 2015 and was recognized as a World Economic Forum Young Global Leader in the same year. In 2010, the Africa Leadership Institute named him an Archbishop Desmond Tutu Fellow. 

As of December 2020, he serves as a global board member of The Nature Conservancy, Nabo Capital and the Governing Council at Amref University.He previously served as a member of the Global Agenda Council on Africa at the World Economic Forum (WEF), from 2012 until 2014. He also served s a member of he WEF's Council on Risk and Resilience, from 2014 until 2016. 

He is fluent in Kikuyu, Kiswahili and English.

Family
Edwin Macharia is married to Lorna Irungu and together are the parents of a teenage daughter who was born circa 2008.

See also
 Ory Okolloh
 Sanda Ojiambo
James Mwangi

References

External links
 Brief Biography
 Homepage of Dalberg Consulting

Living people
1979 births
Kenyan chief executives
People from Nairobi
Amherst College alumni
Kikuyu people